Røyken Church is a church in the Røyken municipality in Viken county, Norway.
Røyken Church serves Røyken parish in the Lier rural deanery of the Church of Norway.

History
Røyken Church is a medieval nave stone church constructed of local red granite. It is believed to date from the 1220s. The first written record of the church appeared in Eysteinn Erlendsson's  in 1392. The church displays the same strict simplicity that characterizes many churches from the same time.

The church has a rectangular nave with stone walls that are around 2 meters thick. Major repair of the church was made during 1859. The interior, which has been painted several times, was restored in the 1930s.
An extensive restoration of the church was conducted between 1936-39.

The church has a medieval baptismal font made from soapstone. The altarpiece dates from the 17th century.

References

External links

 Røyken Church Official site

13th-century churches in Norway
Churches in Viken
Røyken
13th-century establishments in Norway
Churches completed in 1229